Ptychodes alboguttatus is a species of beetle in the family Cerambycidae. It was described by Henry Walter Bates in 1880. It is known from Mexico.

References

Lamiini
Beetles described in 1880